Rosemère station is a commuter rail station operated by Exo in Rosemère, Quebec, Canada. It is served by  the Saint-Jérôme line.

The station is located in ARTM fare zone C, and currently has 382 parking spaces. Prior to the reform of the ARTM's fare structure in July 2022, it was in zone 5.

Connecting bus routes

CIT Laurentides

References

External links 
  Rosemère Commuter Train Station Information (RTM)
 Rosemère Commuter Train Station Schedule (RTM)
CIT Laurentides 

Exo commuter rail stations
Railway stations in Laurentides
Railway stations in Canada opened in 1997
1997 establishments in Quebec